Timeblock is a research project that was developed in Switzerland to discover blue zones and aging-process solutions.

History and origins 
The project Timeblock began as a research project by a group of scientists from the Swiss Bluezones Research Group. The term "blue zones" was created by Dr. Michel Poulain and his colleague Giovanni Mario Pes, who discovered the first blue zone in Italy: an area in which an above average number of people live to be 100 years old or older.

In 1997, the Swiss Research Group started investigating lifestyles, diets and living environments in blue zones (mainly in Japan and Switzerland). Their first focus was the small village Yuzurihara. In 2007, they started to analyse 108 special species of plants for their cancer-fighting and anti-aging properties. In 2014, the Bluezones Research Group and the University of Vienna investigated secondary plant substances from blue zone regions (mainly Tibet and Nepal-Himalayas) growing in remote areas and high altitudes to show that Timeblock can slow down cell rejuvenation by lengthening telomeres 17%.

Timeblock has two main product lines: Nutrition Care (Nutraceuticals) and Facial Care (Cosmeceuticals), which is claimed to remodel a person's epigenome in order to optimize the individual DNA. Their Nutraceuticals capsules are vegan, non-GMO, gluten-free, lactose-free, and free from chemical preservatives made of plants such as barley grass, green tea (epigallocatechin gallate), wheatgrass, shiitake mushrooms (vitamin D), marigold (zeaxanthin and lutein), grape seeds (flavonoids), tomatoes (lycopene), brown algae (omega-3). Cosmeceuticals lotion contains equol, IGF-1 and EGF (insulin-like growth factor and epidermal growth factor), epigallocatechin gallate, microalgae extract and Âmeflore essential oils to promote cell renewal and regeneration to counteract the signs of aging.

The active substance in Timeblock Skin Care is equol. The topical effect of equol as an anti-aging and skin health improving substance was shown in different studies. Equol can occur as different isomers: R-equol, S-equol and RS-equol. Each of these forms has different characteristics, bioavailabilities and molecular effects. As an antioxidative operating substance, equol can decrease the aging process by reducing ROS events. Additionally, the phytoestrogenic properties positively influence the skin health.

Awards 
In 2019, TimeBlock won Global Health and Travel Awards "Product of the Year" award.

See also 

 Blue zone
 Antiaging

Blue zones
Determinants of health
Life extension
Longevity

References 

1997 establishments in Switzerland